The 2013 S.League season is Geylang International's 18th season in the top flight of Singapore football and 38th year in existence as a football club.

Squad

Coaching staff

Pre-Season Transfers

In

Out

Mid-Season Transfers

In

Out

Pre-season Friendlies

Club Friendlies

S.League

Round 1

Round 2

Round 2.5

Singapore League Cup

Singapore Cup

Squad stats

Goals & Appearances
''Updated Dec 23, 2013

|}

Disciplinary

References 

Geylang International
Geylang International FC seasons